Elementary Principles in Statistical Mechanics, published in March 1902, is a work of scientific literature by Josiah Willard Gibbs which is considered to be the foundation of modern statistical mechanics. Its full title was Elementary Principles in Statistical Mechanics, developed with especial reference to the rational foundation of thermodynamics.

Overview
In this book, Gibbs carefully showed how the laws of thermodynamics would arise exactly from a generic classical mechanical system, if one allowed for a certain natural uncertainty about the state of that system.

The themes of thermodynamic connections to statistical mechanics had been explored in the preceding decades with Clausius, Maxwell, and Boltzmann, together writing thousands of pages on this topic. One of Gibbs' aims in writing the book was to distill these results into a cohesive and simple picture. Gibbs wrote in 1892 to his colleague Lord Rayleigh He had been working on this topic for some time, at least as early as 1884 when he produced a paper (now lost except for its abstract) on the topic of statistical mechanics.

Gibbs' book simplified statistical mechanics into a treatise of 207 pages. At the same time, Gibbs fully generalized and expanded statistical mechanics into the form in which it is known today. Gibbs showed how statistical mechanics could be used even to extend thermodynamics beyond classical thermodynamics, to systems of any number of degrees of freedom (including microscopic systems) and non-extensive systems.

At the time of the book's writing, the prevailing understanding of nature was purely in classical terms: Quantum mechanics had not yet been conceived, and even basic facts taken for granted today (such as the existence of atoms) were still contested among scientists. Gibbs was careful in assuming the least about the nature of physical systems under study, and as a result the principles of statistical mechanics laid down by Gibbs have retained their accuracy (with some changes in detail but not in theme), in spite of the major upheavals of modern physics during the early 20th century.

Content 
V. Kumaran wrote the following comment regarding Elementary Principles in Statistical Mechanics:

References

External links 

 Freely available digitized version on the Internet Archive

1902 non-fiction books
Physics textbooks
1902 in science
English-language books